The 1996 Indiana gubernatorial Election was held on November 5, 1996, alongside the election of both houses of the Indiana General Assembly. Incumbent Governor Evan Bayh, a Democrat, was ineligible to run for a third consecutive term due to term limits established by the Indiana Constitution. He was succeeded by Lt. Governor Frank O'Bannon, who won election over Republican Stephen Goldsmith with 52% of the vote.

Primaries

Democratic Party
Candidates
Lt. Governor Frank O'Bannon

O'Bannon was unchallenged in his party's primary, winning the Democratic nomination unanimously. He chose South Bend Mayor Joe Kernan to be his running mate.

Republican Party
Candidates
Mayor of Indianapolis and nominee for Lieutenant Governor in 1988 Stephen Goldsmith
Former Marine Sergeant Rex Early
George Witwer

Declined
Former Vice President of the United States Dan Quayle

With Governor Evan Bayh unable to seek another term in office, Indiana Republicans felt confident in their ability to take the Governor's Mansion in the general election. Of the three candidates for the nomination, the front-runner by far was Indianapolis Mayor Stephen Goldsmith. Goldsmith was by far the favorite for the nomination throughout the race, in some polls leading by as much as 20 points. The race was particularly heated: Indiana Republican Party Chairman Michael McDaniel, hoping to avoid alienating any voters, declined to endorse a candidate, instead hanging a Swiss flag in his office to symbolize his neutrality.
Goldsmith easily won the primary. Goldsmith endorsed no candidate for lieutenant governor, and Republican state convention delegates chose Witwer as his running mate.

Libertarian Party
Candidates
Steve Dillon

The Libertarian Party nominated Steve Dillon as their second candidate to contest the Indiana governorship.

Dillon's running mate was Leona McPherson.

General election
The only Great Lakes state to have a Democratic Governor going into the 1996 elections, Indiana became the center of the Republican Party's attention in that year's gubernatorial elections. A traditionally Republican state, Goldsmith and his party were considered to have the edge in the election. That changed, however, when questions about Goldsmith's performance as Mayor of Indianapolis surfaced, specifically regarding an August 27 brawl in the city involving several drunken policemen. Goldsmith's campaign was further hurt when it was revealed that several comments made about O'Bannon's record as part of the Indiana state government had been statistically incorrect. The effect of these gaffes was to erase the double digit lead Goldsmith had enjoyed throughout the summer, leaving him narrowly trailing O'Bannon.
O'Bannon, meanwhile, was able to take credit for a thriving economy and a recent tax surplus that had occurred during Bayh's administration. The Democrat centered his campaign on his record in the Indiana State Senate, simultaneously attacking Goldsmith for controversial decisions made during his tenure as Mayor of Indianapolis. By running what was later described as a "steady" campaign, O'Bannon was able to refute many of the charges Goldsmith brought against him while keeping the pressure on. Even so, the race remained tight down to election night, and Goldsmith reportedly settled in on November 5 expecting to be elected.

Results
O'Bannon won the election narrowly, carrying 52% of the vote to Goldsmith's 47%.

References

1996
Gubernatorial
Indiana